The following is an episode list for the show Hepsi 1. As of December 29, 2007, 30 episodes had aired.

Season 1: 2007

Season 2: 2007-2008

External links 
 

RandB
Hepsi